Thyanta pseudocasta is a species of stink bug in the family Pentatomidae. It is found in North America.

References

Further reading

 

Articles created by Qbugbot
Insects described in 1926
Pentatomini